Stanislav Galić (Serbian Cyrillic: Станислав Галић; born 12 March 1943) is a Bosnian Serb soldier and former commander of the Sarajevo-Romanija Corps of the Army of Republika Srpska (VRS) during the War in Bosnia and Herzegovina. He was convicted of Terror as a Crime against humanity, and murder as violations of the laws and customs of War, for his part in the Siege of Sarajevo.

Background
Galić was born in the hamlet of Goleš, in the municipality of Banja Luka, Bosnia and Herzegovina. Prior to the beginning of the war he was an officer in the Yugoslav National Army. On 7 September 1992 he became the commander of the Sarajevo-Romanija Corps (Sarajevsko-romanijski korpus), the unit of the VRS which besieged Sarajevo, the capital of Bosnia and Herzegovina. Galić remained commander of the SRK until 10 August 1994 which is when he was replaced by Dragomir Milošević.

War crimes
In 1998 the International Criminal Tribunal for the Former Yugoslavia indicted Galić on the basis of individual responsibility on charges of murder, inhumane acts other than murder, crimes against humanity, unlawfully inflicting terror upon civilians, attacks on civilians and violations of the laws and customs of war. The indictment was sealed until Galić was arrested by the British SAS on 20 December 1999. On 5 December  2003, his trial ended in a conviction and a 20-year sentence for the shelling and sniping of Sarajevo. Galić appealed the judgement. On 30 November 2006, his appeal was rejected and the appeals chamber extended his sentence from 20 years to life imprisonment. He was taken to Germany to serve his sentence.

References

1943 births
Living people
People from Banja Luka
People convicted by the International Criminal Tribunal for the former Yugoslavia
Serbs of Bosnia and Herzegovina convicted of war crimes
Bosnia and Herzegovina prisoners sentenced to life imprisonment
Serbian prisoners sentenced to life imprisonment
Prisoners sentenced to life imprisonment by international courts and tribunals
Siege of Sarajevo
Serbs of Bosnia and Herzegovina convicted of crimes against humanity
Officers of the Yugoslav People's Army
Army of Republika Srpska soldiers